SAE J2450 is a statistical tool that automakers use to grade the quality of the translation of a document.  The analyst tallies up certain types of translation errors in the document (misspellings, punctuation, etc.) and then uses SAE J2450 to come up with a final grade.

The purpose of this metric was to create a consistent standard to judge the quality of translation of automotive service information.  It does not matter what the source or the target language is.  The metric can be applied to either human translation or machine translation.

History
The SAE J2450 Translation Quality Metric was developed by Society of Automotive Engineers (SAE).   Its initial name was "J2450 Task Force on a Quality Metric for Language Translation of Service Information".

The first version of SAE J2450 was Created by General Motors, Ford and Fiat Chrysler; it was released in August, 2001 as a recommended practice.  However, At the end of 2001, a European SAE-2450-Committee was founded to fix problems in and improve the original metric. Members of this committee came from the language staffs at Volvo Trucks, Daimler-Chrysler, Audi and Volkswagen and other European translation agencies. After negotiations between the American and European car makers, J2450 became an SAE-Norm  in 2005.

Description
SAE J2450  bases quality scores on seven types of errors:,  wrong term, syntactic error, omission, word structure or agreement error, misspelling, punctuation error and miscellaneous error.

Errors in each category can be classified as either major or minor, with a numeric score attached to each error and severity level (ibid.). The composite score, which decides the translation quality of a text, is the weighted sum of the errors normalized by the number of words in the source text (ibid.). This simple statistical approach makes comparison of the quality figures of different texts easy, while examination of the errors in specific categories can assist in the identification of particular problem areas.

Quality benchmark
Since its publication, SAE J2450 Translation Quality Metric has become one of the most important measurements in judging the quality of translation in the automobile industry and has been adopted by many translation service providers and car manufacturers.

SAE J2450  makes comparison of the quality figures of different texts easy; secondly, the examination of the errors in specific categories can assist in the identification of particular problem areas; finally, it helps to eliminate post-translation review processes, as already confirmed in the empirical study carried out by Don (2004).

References

1997 establishments
Translation
Quality management